In the musculoskeletal anatomy of the human head, lateral to the incisive fossa of the maxilla is a depression called the canine fossa.  It is larger and deeper than the comparable incisive fossa, and is separated from it by a vertical ridge, the canine eminence, corresponding to the socket of the canine tooth;

See also
 Fossa

References

External links
 UNC

Bones of the head and neck
Facial features
Biological anthropology